Claire Oakley (born 1985) is a British film director and screenwriter. She began her career directing multiple short films, including Tracks (2014) and Physics (2012) before writing and directing her first feature film Make Up (2019).



Early life and education 
Oakley was raised in Hammersmith, West London and later studied English Literature at the University of Edinburgh, where she first developed an interest in film.

Career 
Her career began as a script reader working at various companies, including BBC Films and the BFI, before writing and directing her first short film Beautiful Enough (2010). She subsequently directed four more short films.

Her first feature film Make Up was released in 2020 to critical acclaim; on review aggregator Rotten Tomatoes, 43 critics gave the film a positive review, with Robbie Collin of The Daily Telegraph writing "as poetically teasing as it is psychologically precise, Make Up signals the arrival of an exciting new talent".

Oakley is currently working on a second feature film, adapted from the novel English Animals.

She also founded Cinesisters, an "inclusive collective of female directors" with over 175 members which aims to support and provide resources to female filmmakers.

Personal life 
Oakley lives in East London with her wife.

Filmography 
Feature Films

Short Films

References

External links

British film directors
British women film directors
Alumni of the University of Edinburgh
British women screenwriters
Living people
1985 births